The Netherlands is accredited to Uruguay from its embassy in Buenos Aires, Argentina, and honorary consulate in Montevideo. Uruguay has an embassy in The Hague.

There are small numbers of Dutch immigrants in Uruguay. In the last decades of the 20th century, some Uruguayans emigrated to the Netherlands.

Both countries have subscribed a series of bilateral agreements:
 Investment promotion and protection agreement (1988)
 Tax information exchange (2013)

The Netherlands are a significant destination for Uruguayan exports.

See also 
 Foreign relations of the Netherlands
 Foreign relations of Uruguay 
 Uruguayans in the Netherlands

References

External links 
 

 
Bilateral relations of Uruguay
Uruguay